Pierre Numa Charbonnet Jr. (December 22, 1922 – November 24, 2005) was a vice admiral in the United States Navy. A 1941 graduate of the United States Naval Academy, he was Chief of the United States Naval Reserve from August 1974 until September 1978. From 1971 until 1974, then a rear admiral, he served as Commander Fleet Air Mediterranean for the United States Sixth Fleet. His awards included the  Navy Distinguished Service Medal, Legion of Merit, Distinguished Flying Cross and Air Medal. He retired on September 1, 1978. Charbonnet died in 2005 and is buried at Arlington National Cemetery.

References

1922 births
2005 deaths
Burials at Arlington National Cemetery
People from San Francisco
Recipients of the Distinguished Flying Cross (United States)
Recipients of the Legion of Merit
Recipients of the Navy Distinguished Service Medal
United States Navy pilots of World War II
United States Navy vice admirals
Military personnel from California